The C-USA men's soccer tournament was the conference championship tournament in soccer for Conference USA (C-USA). The tournament was held every year from 1995 until 2021.  It was a single-elimination tournament and seeding is based on regular season records. The winner, declared conference champion, received the conference's automatic bid to the NCAA Division I men's soccer championship. 

C-USA stopped sponsoring men's soccer after the 2021 NCAA Division I men's soccer season when it lost all nine of its members due to conference realignment. In April 2022, it was announced that five of its members (Coastal Carolina, Kentucky, Marshall, Old Dominion, and South Carolina) would join the Sun Belt Conference for the fall 2022 season, as would West Virginia, which had previously announced a planned move of men's soccer from the Mid-American Conference to C-USA. One month later, the remaining four members (Charlotte, FIU, Florida Atlantic, and UAB) announced they would join the American Athletic Conference effective fall 2022.

Format
The top eight (6) teams determined by points following the regular season will qualify for a single-elimination tournament. The top two seeds will receive a bye. Competition dates are set for Wednesday, Friday and Sunday to allow a day between quarterfinals, semifinals and the championship final.

Champions

By year

By school

References

 
Conference USA men's soccer
NCAA Division I men's soccer conference tournaments
Recurring sporting events established in 1995
1995 establishments in the United States
2022 disestablishments in the United States